Pierre-Claude Foucquet (1694 – February 13, 1772) was a French organist and harpsichordist.

Foucquet was born in Paris, the son of Pierre Foucquet and Anna-Barbe Domballe.  He was born into a family of musicians.  At age 18, he was appointed as the organist at Saint Honoré church in Paris. Following this appointment he was the organist in several important churches: the Royal Abbey of St Victor (destroyed during the French Revolution), the St Eustache church, the Chapel Royal where he succeeded François d'Agincourt (1758), and the Notre-Dame Cathedral. At the end of his life he had to resign his appointment as organist due to illness, but was given a pension by the King.

His output includes:
Three harpsichord books (before 1751)
 Pièces de clavecin – Oeuvre première - Les Caractères de la Paix in C:
La Renommée
Marche en rondeau
Fanfare
Le Feu
Les Grâces pour musette
2ème Musette
Les Ris: rondeau
Tambourin
Les Jeux: rondeau
Second Livre de Pièces de clavecin
Les Forgerons, le Concert des faunes et autres pièces de clavecin. Troisième Livre
Several arias for two parts and continuo (‘’La belle Silvie’’ etc.)

See also
French baroque harpsichordists

External links

1694 births
1772 deaths
French classical organists
French male organists
Cathedral organists
French harpsichordists
French male classical composers
French Baroque composers
18th-century keyboardists
18th-century classical composers
18th-century French composers
18th-century French male musicians
17th-century male musicians
Male classical organists